Mugesera v Canada (Minister of Citizenship and Immigration), [2005] 2 S.C.R. 100, is a leading Supreme Court of Canada decision. The Court upheld the deportation order for Léon Mugesera, a politician from Rwanda, on the grounds of inciting hatred and for suspicion of crimes against humanity for his alleged role in the Rwandan genocide.

See also
 List of Supreme Court of Canada cases (McLachlin Court)

External links
 

Canadian immigration and refugee case law
Supreme Court of Canada cases
Canadian administrative case law
2005 in Canadian case law
2005 in international relations
Deportation from Canada
Canada–Rwanda relations